Blogger's Wife is a 2017 Nollywood film produced by Seun Oloketuyi and directed by Toka McBaror. The movie addresses managing  professional and family spaces and it stars Segun Arinze, Adejumoke Aderounmu, Deyemi Okanlawon, Ijeoma Grace Agu and Adeniyi Johnson.

Synopsis 
The film revolves around a male blogger whose power lie in his internet-enabled laptop who had to meet the wife's expectation. These expectations created suspense through out the film.

Premiere 
The movie was premiered 10 February 2017 and the screening was graced by notable people such as Tamara Eteimo, Feyi Akinwale, Gbenga Adeyinka, Aishat Lawal, Aderounmu Adejumoke, Adunni Ade, Deyemi Okanlawon, Funmi Awelewa and others.

Cast 
Deyemi Okanlawon
Ijeoma Grace Agu
Adeniyi Johnson
Seun Omojola
Segun Arinze
Adunni Ade
Aisha Lawal
Adejumoke Aderounmu
Bukunmi Oluwashina

References

Further reading 
 

2017 films
Nigerian drama films
English-language Nigerian films